Warneckea cordiformis is a species of plant in the family Melastomataceae. The species is found in Mozambique, and is currently Critically endangered due to the bisection of Namacubi Forest.

References

cordiformis